The Institute of Chartered Accountants of Sri Lanka (CA Sri Lanka) is a professional accountancy body in  Sri Lanka.  The Institute was established by Act of Parliament, No. 23 of 1959 as the sole organisation in Sri Lanka with the right to awarding the Chartered Accountant designation. The Institute is responsible for setting Accounting and Auditing Standards in Sri Lanka, and is considered the National Body of Accountants' in the country.

Membership
In Sri Lanka, only members of CA Sri Lanka can practice as "Chartered Accountant". There are two grades of members;
 Associate (ACA)
 Fellow (FCA)

Associate membership is gained after completing three levels of examinations and serving as a clerk serving under articles with a member of the Institute in practice or with a member of the Institute who is a salaried employee in the service of a firm of accountants for a minimum three-year practical training period. They are known as articled clerks during this period. Fellowship is awarded to senior Chartered accountants.

Chartered accountants holding practicing certificates may also become "Registered Auditors", who are able to perform statutory financial audits in accordance with the Companies Act, No. 07 of 2007''. Chartered Accountants can also register as Company Secretaries.

Affiliations
The Institute of Chartered Accountants of Sri Lanka enjoys agreements with the Institute of Chartered Accountants in England and Wales, CPA Australia, and several other leading international accountancy bodies.

CA Sri Lanka is a member of the International Federation of Accountants, Confederation of Asian and Pacific Accountants  and a founder member of the South Asian Federation of Accountants. CA Sri Lanka is also a member of the Chartered Accountants Worldside

Criticisms
CA Sri Lanka has been criticized for allowing audit firms (especially firms which carry the name as Big Four) to take undue advantage of articled clerks (interns) who would have to work in these firms for low wages to cover the practical training period required by the institute, which intern is headed by partners of these firms. Yet, institute hasn't taken any action towards this.

See also
Accounting in Sri Lanka
Association of Accounting Technicians of Sri Lanka
Institute of Certified Management Accountants of Sri Lanka

References

External links
Official website

Sri Lanka
Organizations established in 1959
Professional accounting bodies in Sri Lanka
Universities and colleges in Colombo District
Member bodies of the International Federation of Accountants
Accounting in Sri Lanka
Universities in Sri Lanka